The Diocese of Morocco (or Marrakesh, Spanish Marruecos) was a Christian diocese. It is presently a Latin Catholic titular see, i.e. a former diocese that no longer functions.

History 
The diocese was established in 1226 on Moroccan territory split off from Metropolitan Archdiocese of Toledo, presumably its Metropolitan. In 1237? it gained territory from the suppressed Diocese of Fez.

On 4 April 1417 it lost territory to establish the Roman Catholic Diocese of Ceuta, in 1500 it was suppressed.

Episcopal ordinaries 
''(incomplete?) - all Latin rite; many European members of Latin missionary congregations

 Domingo, Dominican Order (O.P.) (1225.10.27 – 1236), later bishop of Baeza
 Agnello (1237.06.12 – death ?), previously Bishop of Fez (1225 – 1237.06.12)
 Lope Fernández Daín, Friars Minor (O.F.M.) (1246.10.18 – death 1260?)
 Rodrigo Gudal, O.F.M. (1289.12.11 – death 1307?)
 Bernardo Murcia, O.F.M. (1307.08.29 – ?)
 Alfonso Bonhomme, O.P. (1344.01.10 – death 1353?)
 Aymar de Aureliaco (1413.05.10 – 1421.03.21), afterward bishop of Ceuta (Spain) (1421.03.21 – 1443).
 Coadjutor Bishop: Bishop-elect Vicente Trilles, Friars Minor (O.F.M.) (1490.12.20 – ?)

Titular see 
From its suppression as residential diocese in 1500, it remained a Latin titular bishopric, which has had the following incumbents, all of the lowest (Episcopal) rank, but remained vacant for over a century : 
BIOS to ELABORATE
 Pedro Montemolín (1500–?) 
 Martín Cabeza de Vaca, Dominican Order (O.P.) (1508.01.28 – 1534)
 Sebastián Obregón, Benedictine Order (O.S.B.) (1534.12.02 – 1559.01.08)
 Bishop-elect Sancho Díaz de Trujillo (1539.09.09 – ?)
 Juan Terés (1575.02.04 – 1579.05.22) (later Archbishop)
 Miguel Espinosa (1579.10.26 – 1601.10.07)
 Tomás Espinosa (1606.09.25 – 1631.06.16)
 Valerio Maccioni (1668.09.17 – 1676.09.05)
 Piotr Mieszkowski (1678.06.06 – ?)
 John Skarbek (later Archbishop) (1696.01.02 – 1713.01.30)
 Jan Franciszek Kurdwanowski, Jesuits (S.J.) (1713.05.22 – 1729.12.28)
 João de Silva Ferreira (1742.11.26 – 1775.01.19)
 John Geddes (1779.09.30 – 1799.02.11)
 Carolus von Aulock (1826.03.13 – 1830.05.03)
 Bishop-elect Maria Nicolaus Silvester Guillon (1832.12.17 – ?)
 Felicissimo Coccino, Capuchin Friars (O.F.M. Cap.) (1855.12.18 – 1878.02.27)
 Louis-Callixte Lasserre, O.F.M. Cap. (1881.03.15 – 1903.08.22).

Namesake and successor jurisdiction 
In 1469, a diocese again called Marocco (by now synonymous with Morocco) was established, with episcopal see in Tangiers, which after suppression, restoration as Apostolic Prefecture of Marocco (again alias Marruecos) and promotion to Apostolic Vicariate of Marocco became in 1956 the present, still exempt Roman Catholic Archdiocese of Tanger.

See also 
 List of Catholic dioceses in Morocco, Mauretania and Western Sahara

References

Sources and external links 
 GCatholic, with incumbent biography links

Catholic titular sees in Africa
Former Roman Catholic dioceses in Africa